"True Grit" is a song written by Don Black and Elmer Bernstein, and recorded by American country music artist Glen Campbell. It was released in July 1969 as the first single from his album True Grit. The song peaked at number 9 on the Billboard Hot Country Singles chart. It also reached number 1 on the RPM Country Tracks chart in Canada.

Chart performance

References

Film theme songs
1969 singles
1969 songs
Glen Campbell songs
Capitol Records singles
Song recordings produced by Al De Lory
Songs written for films
Songs with lyrics by Don Black (lyricist)
True Grit
Songs with music by Elmer Bernstein